Willem II, also known as Willem II Tilburg, is a Dutch football club based in Tilburg, Netherlands. They play in the Eerste Divisie, the second tier of Dutch football, following relegation from the Eredivisie in the 2021–22 season. The club was founded on 12 August 1896 as Tilburgia. On 12 January 1898, the club was renamed Willem II after Dutch king William II of the Netherlands (1792–1849), who, as Prince of Orange and commander of the Dutch army, had his military headquarters in Tilburg during the Belgian uprising of 1830, spent much time in the city after becoming king, and died there.

Notable former players for the club include Dutch internationals Jan van Roessel, Joris Mathijsen, Jaap Stam, Frenkie de Jong, Marc Overmars, Virgil Van Dijk and Finland's Sami Hyypiä. The club's shirt consists of red-white-blue vertical stripes, inspired by the colours of the flag of the Netherlands. Willem II plays its home matches in the Koning Willem II Stadion, also named after the King. The stadium, opened on 31 May 1995, has a capacity of 14,700 spectators. The average attendance in 2004–05 was 12,500 people.

The club has won the Eredivisie and the Eerste Divisie three times each.

History
Established on 12 August 1896 in Tilburg as Tilburgia, the club first played at the Gemeentelijk Sportpark Tilburg and in 1995 relocated to the Koning Willem II Stadion, the ground where they have played ever since. Willem were champions of the Eredivisie in 1916, 1952 and 1955. The Tricolores also won two KNVB Cups in 1944 and 1963 and were also crowned champs of the Eerste Divisie in 1958, 1965 and 2014.

With regard to European competition, Willem II first appeared in UEFA Cup Winners' Cup of 1963 where they lost to Manchester United in the first round by an aggregate score of 7–2. In 1998–99, Willem once again competed in the Cup Winners' Cup and after beating Dinamo Tbilisi of Georgia 6–0 in both legs, Willem then lost to Spanish side Real Betis in the second round, 4–1 on aggregate. A second place in the Eredivisie of 1999 guaranteed the club a UEFA Champions League berth for the first time. At the tournament's group stage, Willem only attained two points in their six group G matches and were thus eliminated. After reaching the KNVB Cup final in 2005 where they lost 4–0 against PSV Eindhoven, Willem II again qualified again for the UEFA Cup, in which they lost to French side AS Monaco in the first round by 5–1 on aggregate.

At the end of the 2010–11 season, Willem II were relegated from the Eredivisie for the first time in 24 years. In the 2011–12 season under new manager Jurgen Streppel Willem II was promoted back to the Eredivisie, but they went right back down the next season after finishing bottom of the table. The club became champions of the Eerste Divisie in the subsequent season and were thus promoted back to the Eredivisie.

In early 2015, journalists at De Volkskrant revealed that Willem II had its matches fixed by an "Asian gambling syndicate", who had paid Willem's players a total sum of €100,000 to lose matches against Ajax and Feyenoord (in October and December 2009). According to the journalists, midfielder Ibrahim Kargbo was the Asians' main contact within the club; Kargbo denies having accepted their money. The Royal Dutch Football Association called the affair "the most concrete case of match fixing in the Netherlands" and took legal action as well as asking UEFA and FIFA to reevaluate previous matches.

In 2019, Willem II reached the KNVB Cup Final for the fourth time in their history. They beat AZ Alkmaar in the semi-finals after a penalty shoot-out, but were defeated by in the final by AFC Ajax.

The fans of Willem II have close links with the fans of English championship club Bristol City. Willem supporters have been known to travel to Bristol, with Bristol City fans heading the other way to Tilburg. At Bristol City's game on 31 October 2009 against Sheffield Wednesday, some Willem II fans were seen in the 'Eastend' of the Ashton Gate Stadium, and songs were sung about Willem II by City fans.

Rivalries
Willem II longest-running and deepest rivalry is with their nearest neighbour, NAC Breda. This rivalry originated in the 1920s. Matches between the two are referred to as the derby of Brabant. The two cities of Breda and Tilburg are just 20 kilometres apart, leading to an intense feeling of a cross-town rivalry, heightened by a feeling that it is city against city with local pride at stake. The cities differ culturally where Breda is considered a working class city and Tilburg is considered more elitist. This is also apparent from the fact that Willem II is named after a Dutch king.

Players

Current squad

Notable players
The players below had senior international cap(s) for their respective countries. Players whose name is listed represented their countries while playing for Willem II.

	

Albania
 Lindon Selahi
Armenia
 Aras Özbiliz
 Norair Aslanyan
Austria
 Andreas Lasnik
Belgium
 Geert De Vlieger
 Moussa Dembélé
 Christophe Grégoire
 Chris Janssens
 Tristan Peersman
Bulgaria
 Igor Tomašić
Burkina Faso
 Ousmane Sanou
Curaçao
 Kemy Agustien
 Darryl Lachman
Czech Republic
 Tomáš Galásek
Denmark
 Lucas Andersen
Finland
 Juha Hakola
 Sami Hyypiä
 Joonas Kolkka
 Jukka Koskinen
 Veli Lampi
 Niki Mäenpää
Gambia
 Jatto Ceesay

Guinea
 Mohamed Sylla
Hungary
 Csaba Fehér
 Zsombor Kerekes
Israel
 Ben Sahar
Kosovo
 Arijanet Muric
 Donis Avdijaj
Luxembourg
 Aurélien Joachim
Morocco
 Rochdi Achenteh
 Youssef Mariana
 Mourad Mghizrat
 Adil Ramzi
 Tarik Sektioui
Netherlands
 Kevin Bobson
 Bud Brocken
 Romano Denneboom
 Nicky Hofs
 Kew Jaliens
 Bert Konterman
 Michel Kreek
 Kees Krijgh
 Denny Landzaat
 Joris Mathijsen
 Oscar Moens
 Marc Overmars
 Martijn Reuser
 Jaap Stam
	
Netherlands (continued)
 Virgil van Dijk
 Jean-Paul van Gastel
 Ulrich van Gobbel
 Frenkie de Jong
 Toine van Mierlo
 Jan van Roessel
 Kenneth Vermeer
New Zealand
 James McGarry
Nigeria
 Bartholomew Ogbeche
Northern Ireland
 James Quinn
Peru
 Renato Tapia
Sierra Leone
 Ibrahim Kargbo
Slovakia
 Adam Nemec
Switzerland
 Stephan Keller
Sweden
 Alexander Isak
 Andreas Landgren
 George Mourad
Thailand
 Geoffrey Prommayon
Ukraine
 Evgeniy Levchenko
United States
 Earnie Stewart

Domestic results

Below is a table with Willem II's domestic results since the introduction of the Eredivisie in 1956.

Club Officials

Coaches

Honours
 National Football League Championship/Eredivisie
 Winners (3):  1915–16, 1951–52, 1954–55
 Runners-up (1):  1998–99
 Eerste Divisie
 Winners (3):  1956–57, 1964–65, 2013–14
 Runners-up (1):  1986–87
 KNVB Cup
 Winners (2):  1943–44, 1962–63
 Runners-up (2):  2004–05, 2018–19

See also
Dutch football league teams

References

External links

Willem II on Twitter
Willem II on Instagram

 
Association football clubs established in 1896
1896 establishments in the Netherlands
Football clubs in the Netherlands
Football clubs in Tilburg